Sofia Andreevna Muravieva  (born 4 August 2006) is a Russian figure skater. She is the 2021 JGP Cup of Austria champion, the 2021 JGP Slovakia silver medalist, and a two-time Russian junior national bronze medalist (2021, 2022).

She finished sixth at the senior level at the 2022 Russian Championhips.

Career
Muravieva began skating when she was three years old under her first coach, Elena Tchaikovskaia. She began skating at the Academy of Evgeni Plushenko when she was thirteen.

2019–2020 season
Muravieva finished eighth at the fourth stage of the 2019-20 Russian Cup, and she finished fifth at the fifth stage. These results qualified her for the 2020 Russian Junior Championships in Saransk where she finished ninth with a total score of 191.84. In February, she competed in the Russian Cup final in Veliky Novgorod and finished fourth behind Sofia Samodelkina, Sofia Akateva, and Adeliia Petrosian with a total score of 193.64.

2020–2021 season
Muravieva would have been eligible to compete in the 2020–21 ISU Junior Grand Prix circuit; however, the series was canceled due to the global COVID-19 pandemic. At the second stage of the 2020-21 Russian Cup, Muravieva won the silver medal behind Elizaveta Berestovskaya with a total score of 199.10. Then at the fourth stage, she placed third in the short program but withdrew from the free skate. She competed at the 2021 Russian Junior Championships which were held in Krasnoyarsk in February. She won the bronze medal behind Sofia Akateva and Adeliia Petrosian with a total score of 208.13.

2021–2022 season
Muravieva became age-eligible to compete at the senior level in domestic competitions for the 2021-2022 season; however, she was not eligible for senior international competitions because her birthday is one month after the cutoff, 1 July 2006. She received two assignments in the 2021–22 ISU Junior Grand Prix (JGP) circuit. She made her international debut at the 2021 JGP Slovakia, where she placed first in the short program, second in the free skate, and second overall behind Veronika Zhilina with a total score of 208.25. She then competed at the 2021 JGP Austria where she won the gold medal with a total score of 211.81. Due to the COVID-19 pandemic, the International Skating Union announced an alternate qualifying procedure for the 2021–22 Junior Grand Prix Final which allowed each winner of the Junior Grand Prix events to qualify for the final as opposed to evaluating the results of each skater over two events. Therefore, Muravieva's gold medal at the Junior Grand Prix in Austria qualified her a spot for the 2021–22 Junior Grand Prix Final. The event was scheduled to be held in Osaka in December; however, the event was canceled due to the COVID-19 pandemic in Japan.

At the third stage of the Russian Cup, Muravieva won the silver medal behind Sofia Samodelkina with a total score of 214.82. Then at the fifth stage in Perm, she won the gold medal with a total score of 216.64. Then at the 2022 Russian Championhips, Muravieva initially finished second in the short program behind Kamila Valieva with a score of 81.87. However, her score was lowered by one point due to a delay in start penalty, which put her in third place behind Anna Shcherbakova. Skaters are given 30 seconds to get into their starting position for the program, but Muravieva took 32 seconds which resulted in the one-point penalty. She placed sixth overall with a total score of 230.31.

At the 2022 Russian Junior Championships, Muravieva won the bronze medal for the second year. She finished behind Sofia Akateva and Sofia Samodelkina, scoring 211.62.

Programs

Competitive highlights 
JGP: Junior Grand Prix

Detailed results 
Small medals for short and free programs awarded only at ISU Championships.

Senior results

Junior results

References

External links 
 
 

2006 births
Living people
Russian female single skaters
Figure skaters from Moscow